is a Japanese cross-country skier. He competed in the men's sprint event at the 2006 Winter Olympics.

References

1979 births
Living people
Japanese male cross-country skiers
Olympic cross-country skiers of Japan
Cross-country skiers at the 2006 Winter Olympics
Sportspeople from Niigata Prefecture
Cross-country skiers at the 2007 Asian Winter Games
21st-century Japanese people